B. D. Memorial International (formerly Bhagawati Devi Memorial Institute) is an institute affiliated with the CBSE board in Pratapgarh, Rajpur Sonarpur, West Bengal, India. It has over 10,000 students. The school is English medium with Bengali and Hindi being taught as vernaculars.

References

External links
 

Primary schools in West Bengal
High schools and secondary schools in West Bengal
Schools in South 24 Parganas district
Educational institutions established in 1966
1966 establishments in West Bengal